Mayo-Sava   is a department of Extreme-Nord Province in Cameroon. The department covers an area of 2,736 km and at the 2005 Census had a total population of 348,890. The capital of the department is at Mora.

Subdivisions
The department is divided administratively into 3 communes and in turn into villages.

Communes 
 Kolofata
 Mora
 Tokombéré

References

Departments of Cameroon
Far North Region (Cameroon)